The following is a list of the world's best-selling female music artists of all time. The criteria for inclusion are women whose claimed record sales have at least reached 75 million or more of their musical productions. Artists are listed in order of the number of records sold alongside available cross-referenced music recording certifications; the highest being for claims of at least 335 million records, and the lowest for claims of 75 million records.

Since there is no official entity that certifies sales in their totality; the artists' sales figure must have been published by a reliable source (news organizations and highly regarded music industry-related organization) such as Billboard, Rolling Stone, MTV, and VH1.

Madonna is believed to have sold the most records among any female music artists in history, with 335 million records sold worldwide, recognized by the Guinness World Records and other major media outlets while the best-selling Latin artist of all time is Shakira with more than 90 million certified records sold.

Female artists by reputed sales

300 million or more records sold

200 million to 299 million records

100 million to 199 million records

75 million to 99 million records

See also
 List of best-selling boy groups
 List of best-selling girl groups
 List of best-selling albums by women
 List of best-selling female rappers
 Women in music

References

Female
Lists of women in music